Marcel Rohrbach (8 April 1933 Ahun – 14 March 2012; Vélizy-Villacoublay) was a French racing cyclist. He finished in ninth place at the 1960 Tour de France.

References

External links

1933 births
2012 deaths
French male cyclists
Sportspeople from Creuse
French Vuelta a España stage winners
Cyclists from Nouvelle-Aquitaine